The Rt Rev John Dacre Vincent MA MC and bar (1 January 1894 – 19 May 1960) was the Bishop of Damaraland, Namibia from 1952 to 1960.

He was born on 1 January 1894, educated at Marlborough and St John's College, Oxford, and ordained in 1921 after World War I service with the Devonshire Regiment. He began his ecclesiastical career with a curacy at Gillingham, Dorset and was then a Minor Canon at Bloemfontein Cathedral. After this he was Vicar of Longbridge Deverill in Wiltshire until 1937 when he returned to Bloemfontein as its Archdeacon, a position he held until his elevation to the episcopate.

Vincent died on 19 May 1960, aged 66.

References

1894 births
1960 deaths
People educated at Marlborough College
Alumni of St John's College, Oxford
Anglican archdeacons in Africa
20th-century Anglican Church of Southern Africa bishops
Anglican bishops of Damaraland
Recipients of the Military Cross
British Army personnel of World War I
British Army General List officers